Lily Laskine (31 August 1893 in Paris – 4 January 1988 in Paris) was one of the most prominent harpists of the twentieth century. Born Lily Aimée Laskine to Jewish parents in Paris, she studied at the Conservatoire de Paris with Alphonse Hasselmans and became a frequent performing partner of several distinguished French flautists, including Marcel Moyse and Jean-Pierre Rampal. Laskine also served as professor of harp at the Conservatoire de Paris from 1948 to 1958. She was awarded the Legion of Honour in 1958. She died in Paris.

In 1936 she married Roland Charmy, a violinist and academic of the Conservatoire de Paris.

References

Bibliography and discography 
Books
 Marielle Nordmann, Lily Laskine, Éditions Cahiers du Temps, 1999 

Records 
 L'Art de Lily Laskine, 1996 
 Concerto pour flûte et harpe de Wolfgang Amadeus Mozart, 2002 
 Japanese Melodies for Flute and Harp, 1994

External links 

Musicians from Paris
1893 births
1988 deaths
Conservatoire de Paris alumni
Academic staff of the Conservatoire de Paris
French classical harpists
20th-century classical musicians
20th-century French musicians
Officiers of the Légion d'honneur
Grand Cross of the Ordre national du Mérite